The Woody Stephens Stakes is a Grade I American Thoroughbred horse race for three-year-olds run over a distance of seven furlongs on dirt held annually in early June at Belmont Park in Elmont, New York.

History

Inaugurated in 1985 as the Riva Ridge Stakes, it was named in honor of the Hall of Fame inductee and Kentucky Derby winner, Riva Ridge. In 2006, it was renamed in memory of Hall of Fame trainer Woody Stephens, who won eight U.S. Triple Crown races including a record five consecutive editions of the Belmont Stakes.

The event was classified as a Grade III in 1988, upgraded to a Grade II event in 1998, and in 2019 it was upgraded to Grade I.

The race is part of the undercard for the Belmont Stakes and often includes horses that are cutting back in distance after attempting to qualify on the Road to the Kentucky Derby.

The event has been won by champions including Lost in the Fog in 2005 who that year was the American Champion Sprint Horse, and the 1990 Champion 2YO Fly So Free. Also the 2014 winner Bayern would later that year win the Breeders' Cup Classic.

Records
Speed record:
 1:20.33 – You And I (1994)

Margins:
 10 lengths  – Jack Christopher (2022)

Most wins by a jockey:
 3 – Jerry Bailey (1991, 1999, 2000)
 3 – Mike E. Smith (1996, 1998, 2017)
 3 – Edgar Prado (2005, 2006, 2010)
 3 – Joel Rosario (2013, 2016, 2018)

Most wins by a trainer:
 4 – D. Wayne Lukas (1987, 1989, 1995, 1999)

Most wins by an owner:
 2 – Zayat Stables (2008, 2011)

Winners

See also
 List of American and Canadian Graded races

References

Recurring sporting events established in 1985
Horse races in New York (state)
Belmont Park
Flat horse races for three-year-olds
Graded stakes races in the United States
1985 establishments in New York (state)
Grade 1 stakes races in the United States